Trifurcula trasaghica is a moth of the family Nepticulidae. It was described by A. and Z. Laštuvka in 2005. It is known from Udine, Italy. The hostplant for the species is Corothamnus decumbens.

References

Nepticulidae
Moths described in 2005
Endemic fauna of Italy
Moths of Europe